Supervision is used in counselling, psychotherapy, and other mental health disciplines as well as many other professions engaged in working with people. Supervision may be applied as well to practitioners in somatic disciplines for their preparatory work for patients as well as collateral with patients. Supervision is a replacement instead of formal retrospective inspection, delivering evidence about the skills of the supervised practitioners.

It consists of the practitioner meeting regularly with another professional, not necessarily more senior, but normally with training in the skills of supervision, to discuss casework and other professional issues in a structured way. This is often known as clinical or counselling supervision (consultation differs in being optional advice from someone without a supervisor's formal authority). The purpose is to assist the practitioner to learn from his or her experience and progress in expertise, as well as to ensure good service to the client or patient. Learning shall be applied to planning work as well as to diagnostic work and therapeutic work.

Milne (2007) defined clinical supervision as: "The formal provision, by approved supervisors, of a relationship-based education and training that is work-focused and which manages, supports, develops and evaluates the work of colleague/s". The main methods that supervisors use are corrective feedback on the supervisee's performance, teaching, and collaborative goal-setting. It therefore differs from related activities, such as mentoring and coaching, by incorporating an evaluative component. Supervision's objectives are "normative" (e.g. quality control), "restorative" (e.g. encourage emotional processing) and "formative" (e.g. maintaining and facilitating supervisees' competence, capability and general effectiveness).

Some practitioners (e.g. art, music and drama therapists, chaplains, psychologists, and mental health occupational therapists) have used this practice for many years. In other disciplines the practice may be a new concept. For NHS nurses, the use of clinical supervision is expected as part of good practice. In a randomly controlled trial in Australia, White and Winstanley looked at the relationships between supervision, quality of nursing care and patient outcomes, and found that supervision had sustainable beneficial effects for supervisors and supervisees. Waskett believes that maintaining the practice of clinical supervision always requires managerial and systemic backing, and has examined the practicalities of introducing and embedding clinical supervision into large organisations such as NHS Trusts (2009, 2010). Clinical supervision has some overlap with managerial activities, mentorship, and preceptorship, though all of these end or become less direct as staff develop into senior and autonomous roles.

Key issues around clinical supervision in healthcare raised have included time and financial investment. It has however been suggested that quality improvement gained, reduced sick leave and burnout, and improved recruitment and retention make the process worthwhile.

United Kingdom 
Clinical supervision is used in many disciplines in the British National Health Service. Registered allied health professionals such as occupational therapists, physiotherapists, dieticians, speech and language therapists and art, music and drama therapists are now expected to have regular clinical supervision. C. Waskett (2006) has written on the application of solution focused supervision skills to either counselling or clinical supervision work.
Practising members of the British Association for Counselling and Psychotherapy are bound to have supervision for at least 1.5 hours a month. Students and trainees must have it at a rate of one hour for every eight hours of client contact.

The concept is also well used in psychology, social work, the probation service and at other workplaces.

Models or approaches
There are many different ways of developing supervision skills which can be helpful to the clinician or practitioner in their work. Specific models or approaches to both counselling supervision and clinical supervision come from different historical strands of thinking and beliefs about relationships between people. A few examples are given below.

Peter Hawkins (1985) developed an integrative process model which is used internationally in a variety of helping professions. His "Seven Eyed model of Supervision" was further developed by Peter Hawkins along with Robin Shohet, Judy Ryde and Joan Wilmot in "Supervision in the Helping Professions" (1989, 2000 and 2006 and 2012) and with Nick Smith in "Coaching, Mentoring and organisational Consultancy: Supervision and Development" (2006 and 2013) and is taught on the courses of the Centre for Supervision and Team Development  as well as many other supervision training courses.

S. Page and V. Wosket describe a cyclical structure.

F. Inskipp and B. Proctor (1993, 1995) developed an approach based on the normative, formative and restorative elements of the relationship between supervisor and supervisee. The Brief Therapy practice teaches a solution focused approach based on the work of Steve de Shazer and Insoo Kim Berg which uses the concepts of respectful curiosity, the preferred future, recognition of strengths and resources, and the use of scaling to assist the practitioner to progress (described in ). Waskett has described teaching solution-focused supervision skills to a variety of professionals

Evidence-based CBT supervision is a distinctive and recent model that is based on cognitive-behaviour therapy (CBT), enhanced by relevant theories (e.g. experiential learning theory), expert consensus statements, and on applied research findings (Milne & Reiser, 2017). It is therefore an example of evidence-based practice, applied to supervision. CBT supervision meets the general definition of clinical supervision above (Milne, 2007), adding some distinctive features that reflect CBT as a therapy. This includes a high degree of session structure and direction (e.g. detailed agenda-setting), but within a fundamentally collaborative relationship. Also, there is a primary emphasis on cognitive case conceptualization, mainly through the use of case discussion, intended to develop diagrammatic CBT formulations. But discussion should properly be combined with other CBT techniques, including Socratic questioning, guided discovery, educational role-play, behavioural rehearsal, and corrective feedback. Another distinctive aspect is a focus on evidence-based principles and methods, including the use of reliable instruments for feedback and evaluation, in relation to both therapy and supervision. Perhaps the single most defining characteristic of evidence-based CBT supervision is the active and routine commitment to research methods and findings: where other approaches refer to theory and clinical/supervisory experience for guidance, evidence-based CBT supervision appeals ultimately to 'the data'. Examples of the use of relevant theories, expert consensus statements and research, together with six formally-developed supervision guidelines (illustrated through video clips), can be found in Milne & Reiser (2017).

Counselling or clinical supervisors will be experienced in their discipline and normally then have further training in any of the above-mentioned approaches, or others.

See also 
 The works of Lawrence Shulman
 Behavioral psychotherapy

References

Citations

Sources 

 C Waskett. The SF Journey, in Therapy Today, March 2006, Vol. 17, No. 2, pp. 40–42.
 P Hawkins, R Shohet. Supervision in the Helping Professions: an organisational, group and organisational approach; Open University Press, Maidenhead, 2nd ed 2000 3rd Edition 2006, 4th edition 2012
 P Hawkins and N Smith(2006, second edition 2013) "Coaching, Mentoring and Organizational Consultancy: Supervision and Development." Maidenhead:  Open University Press/McGraw Hill. 
 S Page, V Wosket. Supervising the Counsellor: a cyclical model; Routledge, London & New York, 1995
 F Inskipp, B Proctor. The Art, craft and tasks of Counselling supervision, Part 1 – making the most of supervision, Cascade Publications 1993, and Part 2 – becoming a supervisor, 1995
 C Waskett. The pluses of solution-focused supervision, in Healthcare Counselling and Psychotherapy Journal, Vol. 6, No. 1.
 C Waskett. An Integrated Approach to introducing and maintaining supervision: the 4S model. Nursing Times,105:17, 24–26.
 D Milne (2007). An empirical definition of clinical supervision. British Journal of Clinical Psychology, 46, 437–447.
 D Milne & R Reiser (2017). A manual for evidence-based CBT supervision. Chichester: Wiley Blackwell.

External links
 Clinical Supervision for Nurses and Allied Health Professionals: the 4S Model
 Models of Clinical Supervision
 Implementing clinical supervision in healthcare https://web.archive.org/web/20170916091813/http://www.supervisionandcoaching.com/
 Clinical Supervision: 8 Answers to Common Questions and 1 Nobody Knows (But Should) https://therapyinsd.com/mft-lcsw-supervision-8-answers-to-common-questions-and-1-nobody-asks-but-should/

Medical terminology
Homeopathy
Psychotherapy